Prostanthera densa, commonly known as villous mint-bush, is a species of flowering plant in the family Lamiaceae and is endemic to near-coastal areas of New South Wales. It is an erect, often compact shrub with aromatic branches, egg-shaped leaves, and mauve flowers with orange markings inside.

Description
There are a few flowers throughout the year, peaking in spring.

Taxonomy and naming
Prostanthera densa was first formally described in 1920 by Arthur Andrew Hamilton in Proceedings of the Linnean Society of New South Wales.

Distribution and habitat
Villous mint-bush grows in forest and shrubland on the coast and nearby ranges between Nelson Bay and the Beecroft Peninsula.

Conservation status
This mintbush is listed as "vulnerable" under the Australian Government Environment Protection and Biodiversity Conservation Act 1999 and the New South Wales Government Biodiversity Conservation Act 2016. The main threats to the species include land clearing for urban development, dieback caused by Phytophthora cinnamomi'', dumping of garden refuse, weed invasion and disturbance by recreational users.

References

densa
Flora of New South Wales
Lamiales of Australia
Plants described in 1920